Kariera Nikodema Dyzmy is a 1980 Polish television miniseries.  It was based on the 1932 book of the same title by Polish author Tadeusz Dołęga-Mostowicz.

References

External links 
 Stanford listing
 TVP listing

1980 Polish television series debuts
1980 Polish television series endings